Gabrielle Calvocoressi is an American poet, editor, essayist, and professor.

Life and career 
Gabrielle Calvocoressi was born in 1974 in central Connecticut. Their family owned movie theaters, including a drive-in, in several small towns across the state. Calvocoressi, who identifies as nonbinary and lesbian, has used their writing to reflect on their mother's mental illness and suicide; their work also explores small town America, history, sexuality, faith, violence, gender, and the body.

They studied at Sarah Lawrence College and earned an MFA from Columbia University.

They have been a visiting professor of poetry at UCLA, Bennington College, and UC-Irvine, and held a Stegner Fellowship and a Jones Lectureship at Stanford University. They also taught in the MFA program at California College of the Arts.

Calvocoressi is Poetry Editor at Large for the Los Angeles Review of Books (LARB). Stemming from their "deep interest in interdisciplinary approaches to writing, art, and ecological culture," they created Voluble, an "off-the-page makers’ space for writers and artists of all kinds," supported by LARB.

They have written about their experiences with nystagmus and how the visual/neurological difference has shaped their work as a poet and a reader.

They now teach in the Warren Wilson College MFA Program for Writers, and at University of North Carolina Chapel-Hill, where they are an Associate Professor and Walker Percy Fellow in Poetry. They live in North Carolina with their partner Angeline Shaka. Currently, they serve as the director for The Frost Place Conference on Poetry in Franconia, NH.

Awards and honors 
 2000 Stegner Fellowship at Stanford University.
 2002 Rona Jaffe Foundation Writers' Award.
 2002 Jones Lectureship at Stanford University.
 2006 Connecticut Book Award in Poetry, winner for The Last Time I Saw Amelia Earhart.
 2009 Los Angeles Times Book Prize, finalist for Apocalyptic Swing.
 2012 Lannan Foundation Writers' Residency in Marfa.

Works 
 The Last Time I Saw Amelia Earhart. Persea Books. 2005. . 
 Apocalyptic Swing. Persea Books. 2009. . 
 The New Economy Chapbook Vol. 1: Inexpensive, Healthy, Hopeful Feasts for 2017.
 Rocket Fantastic. Persea Books. September 2017. .

References

External links 
 Chapbook: Southern Foodways Alliance > The New Economy Chapbook Vol. 1: Inexpensive, Healthy, Hopeful Feasts for 2017
 Poem: The American Poetry Review > Vol. 44, No. 6 > Praise House: The New Economy by Gabrielle Calvocoressi
 Poem: Boston Review > 2013 > from Rocket Fantastic by Gabrielle Calvocoressi
 Interview: Divedapper > No. 19, March 2015 > An Interview with Gabrielle Calvocoressi by Kaveh Akbar

1974 births
Living people
21st-century American poets
American LGBT poets
Poets from Connecticut
Sarah Lawrence College alumni
Columbia University School of the Arts alumni
American women poets
21st-century American women writers
American lesbian writers
American non-binary writers